Kassie may refer to:

 Kassie DePaiva (born 1961), American actress
 Kassie Miller (born 1982), American model

See also
 Casandra
 Cassandra (disambiguation)
 Cassey (disambiguation)
 Cassi (disambiguation)
 Cassie (disambiguation)
 Kassandra (disambiguation)
 Kassi (disambiguation)
 Kassidi (disambiguation)
 Kassy